is the twenty-second single by Japanese artist Masaharu Fukuyama. It was released on 11 April 2007.

Track listing

Limited Edition CD
Tokyo ni mo Attanda
Muteki no Kimi
Tokyo ni mo Attanda (Original Karaoke)
Muteki no Kimi (Original Karaoke)

Limited Edition DVD
Tokyo ni mo Attanda (Music Clip)

Normal Edition CD
Tokyo ni mo Attanda
Muteki no Kimi
Tokyo ni mo Attanda (Original Karaoke)
Muteki no Kimi (Original Karaoke)

Oricon sales chart (Japan)

References

2007 singles
Japanese film songs